Hossein Nouri may refer to:
 Hossein Nouri (wrestler, born 1990), Iranian wrestler who won bronze medal at the 2017 World Wrestling Championships.
 Hossein Nouri (wrestler, born 1931), Iranian wrestler who competed at the 1956 Summer Olympics.
 Hossein Noori Hamedani, Iranian Twelver Shi'a Marja.
 Hossein Nuri, Iranian painter, playwright and film director.